Arifke or Arif Ke, is a village in Firozepur tehsil of the Firozpur district in Punjab, India. Arifke is located on the junction of new national highways NH 354 and NH 703A.

Demographics
As per 2011 Census of India, total population of Arif Ke was 2,757 persons. Total number of households in Arifke was 528 as per 2011 census. There were total of 1,462 male persons and 1,295 females and a total number of 327 children of 6 years or below in Arif Ke village. The percentage of male population is 53.03%, the percentage of female population is 46.97% and the percentage of child population is 11.86%. Average Sex Ratio of Arif Ke village is 886 which is lower than Punjab state average of 895.

Literacy
In 2011, literacy rate of Arif Ke village was 65.10 % compared to 75.84 % of Punjab. In Arif Ke, male literacy was 69.64 % and female literacy rate was 59.98 %.

References

Villages in Firozpur district